El Islah is a political party in Mauritania led by Sidna Ould Maham.

History
The party joined the coalition supporting President Mohamed Ould Abdel Aziz in March 2011. It won a single seat in the 2013 parliamentary elections.

References

Political parties in Mauritania